Dioryctria adamsi is a species of snout moth in the genus Dioryctria. It was described by Herbert H. Neunzig and L. C. Dow in 1993 and is known from Belize.

References

Moths described in 1993
adamsi